Operation Buffalo is an Australian television comedy-drama series written and directed by Peter Duncan that screened on ABC TV from 31 May 2020.

Synopsis
The series is inspired by true events of British nuclear bomb tests in the 1950s at remote Maralinga, in outback South Australia, specifically the four tests codenamed Operation Buffalo. It follows Major Leo Carmichael as he deals with various pressures and problems during nuclear weapons testing.

Cast

Episodes

Production
The six-part series was filmed in New South Wales with additional filming for desert locations in South Australia. French distributor and production company APC Studios helped fund the project and provided worldwide distribution.

Critical reception 
The series received mixed reviews, attaining a score of 5.0 on IMDb. Luke Buckmaster from The Guardian gave the series three stars out of five and described the series as, "much more fickle: sometimes funny as a comedy, sometimes effective as a drama, but rarely satisfying as a combination of both". Wenlei Ma from News.com.au thought much better of the series, writing: "as much as sombre images of death and destruction can evoke emotional reactions, nothing hits the point as hard as the glaring judgment of satire done well – which is exactly what Operation Buffalo is".

References

External links
 
 "Mushroom clouds, misadventure and murder... ABC drama Operation Buffalo debuts in May", Australian Broadcasting Corporation, 1 May 2020

2020 Australian television series debuts
Television shows set in South Australia
Australian Broadcasting Corporation original programming
English-language television shows
Television series about nuclear war and weapons